Roland Mortier (21 December 1920 – 31 March 2015) was a Belgian scientist at the Université Libre de Bruxelles. He was a member of the Académie royale de langue et de littérature françaises de Belgique and the Académie des Sciences Morales et Politiques. In 1965, he was awarded the Francqui Prize on Human Sciences. He was born in Ghent.

External links
 Groupe d'étude du XVIIIe siècle (DIX) (in French)
 Roland Mortier
Roland Mortier at Arllfb

20th-century Belgian scientists
Academic staff of the Université libre de Bruxelles
1920 births
2015 deaths
Free University of Brussels (1834–1969) alumni
Members of the Académie des sciences morales et politiques
Members of the Académie royale de langue et de littérature françaises de Belgique